EJNYC is an American reality television series that premiered on the E! cable network, on June 19, 2016. The reality show follows the life of EJ Johnson who moves back to New York City. The show is a spin-off of Rich Kids of Beverly Hills.

Production  
The show and cast was announced on June 14, 2016 via E! News.

On November 3, 2016, it was announced that the show will not be returning along with Rich Kids of Beverly Hills.

Cast
The series also features some of his friends and family, referred to as #Glamtourage, including his sister Elisa Johnson, and friends Samaria Smith and Sanaz Panahi.

Lyric McHenry, a cast member, died in August 2018.

References

External links 
 

2010s American reality television series
2016 American television series debuts
2016 American television series endings
English-language television shows
Television shows set in New York City
E! original programming
Mass media portrayals of the upper class
American television spin-offs
Reality television spin-offs